A constitutional referendum was held in Equatorial Guinea on 29 July 1973. The new constitution would make the country a one-party state with the newly formed United National Workers' Party as the sole legal party. The officially reported results indicated that the change was approved by 99% of voters.

Results

References

1973 referendums
Referendums in Equatorial Guinea
1973 in Equatorial Guinea
Constitutional referendums in Equatorial Guinea